Birgitta Larsson-Tollan (née Larsson on 5 June 1950) is a Swedish radio personality and retired athlete. She had her best achievements in the long jump, winning the national title in 1969–71 and finishing 11th at the 1971 European Championships.

Since 1974 Larsson-Tollan works as a journalist and producer of topical programs on the Swedish radio, for which she received several awards from Swedish music and media associations. As of 2011 she lived in Copenhagen, Denmark.

References

Swedish female long jumpers
Swedish female sprinters
1950 births
Living people